Sweet Talker is a soundtrack album by Richard Thompson released in 1991. It is the soundtrack for the Australian film of the same name.

Thompson had worked with composer Peter Filleul on various other soundtrack projects, notably the TV shows The Life and Loves of a She-Devil and The Marksman. In 1990 film producer Taylor Hackford made the movie Sweet Talker which starred and was written by Bryan Brown. Hackford invited Thompson to submit some ideas for a soundtrack and then asked him to work with Filleul to produce a full soundtrack for the film.

The project was a difficult one, with work having to be revisited as Hackford edited and re-edited the film. At its conclusion, Thompson swore that he would never do another soundtrack.

The film was not a success. Thompson's score did little to enhance his reputation, although the instrumental "Persuasion" was subsequently re-written with lyrics by Tim Finn and released as a single in 1993.

Track listing
All songs written by Richard Thompson except where noted.

"Put Your Trust In Me"
"Persuasion" (Peter Filleul, Richard Thompson)
"Roll Up"
"The Dune Ship"
"Conviction" (Peter Filleul, Richard Thompson)
"Boomtown"
"Harry's Theme"
"Sweet Talker" 
"To Hang A Dream On
"Beachport"
"False Or True" (Peter Filleul, Richard Thompson)

Personnel
Richard Thompson - guitar, vocals, mandolin, banjo
Peter Filleul - keyboards, backing vocals
Simon Nicol - guitar
David Paton - bass guitar
Dave Mattacks - drums
Pete Zorn - whistle, percussion, saxophone, bass flute, piccolo
Liz Kitchen - percussion, celeste
Christine Collister - backing vocals
Richard Brunton - guitar, pedal steel guitar
Bob Jenkins - drums
Danny Thompson - double bass
Ian Lynn - keyboards
Steve Ashlie - harmonica
John Kirkpatrick - accordion
Chris Leslie - fiddle
Leuan Jones - harp
Fran Byrne - bodhran
John Andrew Parks - vocals
Richard Bennet - French horn

References 

 Richard Thompson - The Biography by Patrick Humprhies. Schirmer Books. 0-02-864752-1
 http://www.richardthompson-music.com

1991 soundtrack albums
Television soundtracks
Richard Thompson (musician) soundtracks
Capitol Records soundtracks